() is a municipality and village in Frýdek-Místek District in the Moravian-Silesian Region of the Czech Republic. It has about 1,100 inhabitants.

Polish minority makes up 14.4% of the population.

Etymology
The name is patronymic in origin derived from personal name Trzenek. The name evolved from Trzenkowicze (1431, 1450) through Trzankowicze (1523, 1578), Strzankowicze (1571) into Trzanowicze beginning from 1610 (Trzanowiczyche), also the division to Upper (Horní/Górne/Ober) and Lower part (Dolní/Dolne/Nieder) of the village began in the 16th and 17th centuries.

Geography
Třanovice lies in the historical region of Cieszyn Silesia, in the Moravian-Silesian Foothills. The Stonávka River flows through the municipality.

History
Třanovice was first mentioned in a written document in 1431. According to historian Vincenc Prasek, Třanovice was first mentioned already in 1322.

Politically Třanovice belonged then to the Duchy of Teschen, a fee of the Kingdom of Bohemia, which after 1526 became part of the Habsburg monarchy.

Třanovice became a seat of a Catholic parish probably prior to 16th century. After the 1540s Protestant Reformation prevailed in the Duchy of Teschen and a local Catholic church was taken over by Lutherans. It was taken from them (as one from around fifty buildings in the region) by a special commission and given back to the Roman Catholic Church on 24 March 1654.

After Revolutions of 1848 in the Austrian Empire a modern municipal division was introduced in the re-established Austrian Silesia. The village as a municipality was subscribed to the political and legal district of Cieszyn. According to the censuses conducted in 1880–1910 the population of the municipality dropped from 902 in 1880 to 875 in 1910 with a majority being native Polish-speakers (between 95.8% and 97.9%) accompanied by a small German-speaking minority (at most 38 or 4.2% in 1880) and Czech-speaking (at most 12 or 1.4% in 1910). In terms of religion in 1910 the majority were Protestants (53.9%), followed by Roman Catholics (45.2%). Třanovice was also traditionally inhabited by Cieszyn Vlachs, speaking Cieszyn Silesian dialect.

After World War I, fall of Austria-Hungary, Polish–Czechoslovak War and the division of Cieszyn Silesia in 1920, it became a part of Czechoslovakia. Following the Munich Agreement, in October 1938 together with the Zaolzie region it was annexed by Poland, administratively adjoined to Cieszyn County of Silesian Voivodeship. It was then annexed by Nazi Germany at the beginning of World War II. After the war it was restored to Czechoslovakia.

Sights
The Church of Saint Bartholomew was built in the neo-Gothic style in 1902–1904.

Gallery

References

External links

Villages in Frýdek-Místek District
Cieszyn Silesia